Preethi is a 1972 Indian Malayalam-language film, directed by William Thomas. The film stars Madhu, Sheela, Prem Navas and Baby Shabnam. The film's score was composed by A. T. Ummer.

Cast
Madhu
Sheela
Prem Nawas
Baby Shabnam
Bahadoor
Kaduvakulam Antony
N. Govindankutty
Philomina
S. P. Pillai

Soundtrack
The music was composed by A. T. Ummer with lyrics by  Pavithran.

References

External links
 

1972 films
1970s Malayalam-language films